Langtoft is a small village and civil parish in the East Riding of Yorkshire, England.

According to the 2011 UK census, Langtoft parish had a population of 492, an increase on the 2001 UK census figure of 457.

Toponymy
The name Langtoft is derived from Old Norse langr or Old English lang 'long' and Old Norse topt 'site of a house'. It has etymological homonymy with Langtoft, Lincolnshire and Lanquetot (Normandy, Languetot 12th century).

History
In 1823 Langtoft was a civil parish in the Wapentake of Dickering and the Liberty of St Peter's. Population at the time was 416. Occupations included thirteen farmers, two butchers, three shoemakers, two tailors, two grocers, a blacksmith, a corn miller, a stonemason, and the landlords of the George & Dragon and Nelson public houses. Carriers operated between the village and Driffield once a week.

The chronicler Pierre de Langtoft took his name from the village. Also resident in the village during the same era was Margaret De Langtoft, who later became one of the five nuns that formed the Sisterhood of Rosedale Priory.

In the centre of the village is the village green which was a pond, and is still referred to as such by some.

There is a monument to the villagers who died in the two World Wars.

The village was flooded in 1657 and 1892. A plaque on the corner of Back Street and Front Street commemorates the floods with the words: "In commemoration of the great flood of Langtoft April 10th 1657 Height of flood unknown. Also the great flood of Langtoft July 3rd 1892 Height of flood 7½ feet."

Front Street floods to a minor extent during heavy rain. In 2007 the 'pond' flooded causing closure of the road.

Amenities 

The church dedicated to St Peter was designated a Grade I listed building in 1968 and is now recorded in the National Heritage List for England, maintained by Historic England.

The village public house is The Ship Inn which closed in 2015 due to lack of village support. The village shop closed in 2007, and the post office in 2004. Some small businesses are present in the village.

Broadband is available through a scheme to connect all Yorkshire villages by Yorkshire Forward. Broadband is also available over WiFi using Wireless mesh network in a project started before ADSL was made available.

There used to be a primary school, which closed in July 2013. There is a school-bus service to nearby schools.
 
The village has grown over the past few years with new houses being built. An estate development, however, has currently halted as the site is for sale. The previous developer ran out of money.

References

Villages in the East Riding of Yorkshire
Civil parishes in the East Riding of Yorkshire